Raheen may refer to:

Places
Australia
 Raheen (estate), mansion in Kew, Melbourne, Australia

Ireland
 Raheen, County Kerry
 Raheen, County Clare, a townland in Tuamgraney
 Raheen, County Laois, village
 Raheen, County Limerick, suburb of Limerick City
 Raheen, County Westmeath, a townland in Ballymore, barony of Rathconrath
 Raheen, County Wexford, village

See also
 Raheens GAA, Gaelic games club in Caragh, County Kildare, Ireland
 Raheny, a town in Dublin with a similar name